Tony Briffa may refer to:

 Tony Briffa (artist) (born 1959), Maltese artist in Denmark
 Tony Briffa (politician) (born 1971), Australian-Maltese intersex mayor